Charles Patrick Donnelly (10 July 1914 – 27 February 1937) was an Irish poet, republican and left wing political activist. He was killed fighting on the republican side during the Spanish Civil War.

Early life
Born in Killybrackey, near Dungannon, County Tyrone on 10 July 1914 into a family of cattle breeders. His father, Joseph Donnelly sold his farm in 1917 and the family moved to Dundalk and opened a greengrocer's shop. Joseph Donnelly became quite prosperous, running his shop, dealing cattle and buying and selling property in the Dundalk area. In addition to Charles, the Donnellys had five other sons and two daughters. Charles' mother, Rose, died in 1927, when he was 13 years old.

Charles Donnelly received his early education in the Christian Brothers school in Dundalk. When he was 14 in 1928, the family moved again, this time to Dublin, where Joseph bought a house on Mountjoy Square in the north inner city. He enrolled in O'Connell School on North Frederick Street, but was expelled after only a few weeks.  He spent the next few months wandering the streets of Dublin during school time before his father discovered what had happened.  At this time also, Charles met and was befriended by 
radical political activists from the IRA, the Communist Party of Ireland and the left-Republican group, Saor Éire.

His father and aunts then got Charles an apprenticeship with a carpenter, but he gave this up after a year to enroll in University College, Dublin in 1931, where he studied Logic, English, History and the Irish language. In university he began writing poetry and prose for student publications but failed his first year examinations. At this time he also became deeply involved in radical left wing and republican politics. He dropped out of University in 1934, having failed his first year exams three times and joined the radical group, the Republican Congress. There he befriended veteran republicans Frank Ryan and George Gilmore. He also became involved in a romantic relationship with another republican activist, Cora Hughes, Éamon de Valera's goddaughter and later partner of George Gilmore. In July 1934 he was arrested and imprisoned for two weeks for his role in picketing a Dublin bakery with other Congress members. After this, his father expelled him from the family home and he spent a period sleeping rough in parks around Dublin.

Political activism
The Republican Congress split at its first annual meeting in September 1934, but the 20-year-old Donnelly was elected to the National Executive of the truncated organisation. Thereafter, he wrote for the Congress newspaper on political and social questions. In January 1935, Donnelly was again arrested for assaulting a Garda (policeman) at a Congress demonstration and was imprisoned for a month. In February 1935, he left Ireland for London. In the British capital he worked for the Republican Congress London branch and found employment variously as a dishwasher in pubs and cafes and as a reporter with an international news agency. He also wrote articles for various left wing publications.  Together with two other poets, Leslie Daiken and Ewart Milne, he was one of the founders of a duplicated publication called Irish Front.

Eoin McNamee recalled Donnelly as "a frail looking Dublin man with a Tyrone background...he was something of an intellectual and clearly the theorist of the Irish Republican Congress in London at that time. He was well versed in Marxism, wrote for the Congress and Communist press, and frequently appeared on left wing public platforms."

Spanish Civil War
In July 1936, on the outbreak of the Spanish Civil War, he urged the Republican Congress to send fighters to the International Brigades. He himself returned to Dublin with the intention of organising such a force. By the end of 1936, he had gone again to London and joined the Brigades. He reached Spain on 7 January 1937 and at Albacete, met up with an Irish contingent, led by Frank Ryan, known as the Connolly Column who had come to Spain to fight on the Republican side. Donnelly and his comrades were attached to the American Abraham Lincoln Battalion. On 15 February, after receiving only rudimentary military training, the Abraham Lincoln battalion was thrown into the battle of Jarama, near Madrid. Donnelly reached the front on 23 February, where he was promoted to the rank of field commander. On 27 February his unit were sent on a frontal assault on the Nationalist positions on a hill named Pingarron. Donnelly and his unit were pinned down by machine gun fire all day. In the evening, the Nationalists launched a counter-attack.

A Canadian veteran recalled, 
 The line would later become famous. A few minutes later, as his unit retreated, Donnelly was caught in a burst of gunfire. He was struck three times, in the right arm, the right side and the head. He collapsed and died instantly. His body lay on the battlefield until it was recovered by  fellow Irish Brigader Peter O'Connor on 10 March. He was buried at Jarama in an unmarked grave with several of his comrades.

The collection of his work, The Life and Poems, was published in 1987. On the eve of the 71st anniversary of his death, 26 February 2008, Charles was commemorated with the unveiling of a plaque in his alma mater, UCD, attended by 150 people. The commemoration, organised jointly by a group of UCD students and the Donnelly family, was hosted by the School of English and also included a lecture by Gerald Dawe on Charlie's life and poetry. In April 2008, the UCD Branch of the Labour Party was renamed the Charlie Donnelly Branch in his honour. 

Donnelly's friend Blanaid Salkeld commemorates him in her poem "Casualties", writing "That Charlie Donnelly small and frail/ And flushed with youth was rendered pale/ But not with fear, in what queer squalor/ Was smashed up his so-ordered valour." A 1976 documentary about the Civil War by Cathal O'Shannon is entitled 'Even The Olives are Bleeding'.

Notes

Work
 Charlie Donnelly - the life and poems; by Joseph Donnelly, Dublin, Ireland : Dedalus, c1987,

Sources
 O'Connor, Joseph. Even the Olives are Bleeding – the life and times of Charles Donnelly, New Island Books, Dublin 1992;

External links

 
  on Irish politics, 1935-6
 Photoset of the UCD Commemoration in February 2008

1914 births
1937 deaths
20th-century Irish poets
20th-century male writers
International Brigades personnel
Irish anti-fascists
Irish communists
Irish people of the Spanish Civil War
Military personnel killed in the Spanish Civil War
People from Dungannon